Ansel Adams: A Documentary Film is a 2002 documentary and  biographical film that traces the life of the American photographer Ansel Adams.  He is most noted for his landscape images of the American West. The film is narrated by David Ogden Stiers and features the voices of Josh Hamilton, Barbara Feldon, and Eli Wallach. It was broadcast on PBS as part of the series American Experience.

Production

The film features images of Adams' work, readings of his writing, archival footage and original footage of the landscapes that inspired him. Interview subjects included Michael Adams and Anne Adams Helms (Ansel Adams's son and daughter), Mary Street Alinder, Carl Pope, Alex Ross, John Sexton, Jonathan Spaulding, Andrea Gray Stillman, William A. Turnage and John Szarkowski.

Director Ric Burns shot portions of the film in the same landscapes that were the settings for Adams' most iconic images. Said Burns, "to get to the heart of what so inspired Ansel Adams, we literally followed in his footsteps. We lugged our cameras up sheer rock faces and hiked the winding trails that led Ansel to his photographic revelations. And they led us to Ansel."

Critical reception
Laura Fries of Variety wrote: “Burns creates a visually mesmerizing retrospective of Adams’s career...the film examines the inspirations and intentions of the artist who transcended the medium to become an American folk hero.”

Awards

The Alfred I. duPont-Columbia Silver Baton Award 2001-2002
Emmy Award for Outstanding Cultural and Artistic Programming 2002

References

External links
 
 

2002 films
American Experience
American documentary films
Films directed by Ric Burns
Documentary films about photographers
Ansel Adams
2000s English-language films
2000s American films